Petric is a Canadian country music band composed of brothers Jason and Tom Petric from Transcona, Winnipeg, Manitoba, along with the brothers long time friend and band member, Jordan Day. The band officially formed in 2014 and became the first act signed to Dallas Smith's record label Steelhead Music in May 2015. Their debut single, "Here Goes Everything", reached the top 25 on the Billboard Canada Country chart. It is featured on their debut extended play, It Girl, released October 16, 2015.

Background
Petric is composed of Jason Petric ( 1989) on guitar and background / harmony vocals, Tom Petric ( 1992) on lead vocals and Jordan Day on background / harmony vocals . Jason has been working in the music industry since he was fifteen, having previously released two solo albums between 2011 and 2014, and previously served as a back-up guitarist for Manitoban acts. Tom has been training as a singer since age four and became involved with many of his brother's musical projects. "No matter what direction music took us individually," Jason explained to Canadian country music blog Top Country, "we always ended up on stage together," so the brothers decided in 2014 to form a country music group together. The duo performed at the JunoFest and Canadian Country Music Awards showcases in 2014. They were introduced to fellow musician Dallas Smith, who was at the time establishing his then-new record label Steelhead Music, through these events and they later signed to his label.

Discography

Albums

Extended plays

Singles

Music videos

Awards and nominations

References

External links

Canadian country music groups
Country music duos
Musical groups established in 2015
Canadian musical duos
Musical groups from Winnipeg
2015 establishments in Manitoba